Caprock Canyons State Park and Trailway is a Texas state park located along the eastern edge of the Llano Estacado in Briscoe County, Texas, United States, approximately  southeast of Amarillo.

Recreation
In 1993, a hiking, biking, and equestrian rail trail opened that stretches through the park through Floyd, Briscoe, and Hall counties. The trailway was created after the Texas Parks and Wildlife Department acquired  of right-of-way from the abandoned Fort Worth and Denver Railroad's lines between Estelline and South Plains. A unique feature is the  Clarity Railroad Tunnel.

Climate
The park is located in West Texas and has a semi-arid climate. The park receives  of precipitation annually.

Flora and fauna
The area contains badlands with mesquite, cacti and junipers with tall grasses, plums, hackberries and cottonwoods in the canyons.

At the urging of his wife, Charles Goodnight preserved several plains bison from those that were being slaughtered. This herd became one of the genetic sources from which current bison herds descend. The herd was donated to the State of Texas in 1997. In 2011, bison were allowed to roam throughout the park, and the Texas Legislature designated the bison herd at Caprock Canyons State Park as the official State Bison Herd of Texas.  The herd has minimal cattle introgression.

African sheep (Barbary sheep), mule deer, white-tailed deer, coyotes, opossums, raccoons, bobcats, foxes, porcupines, numerous species of snakes and lizards, and over 175 species of birds including golden eagles are found within the park.  Lake Theo contains bass, catfish, and rainbow trout. In the summer of 2012 black-tailed prairie dogs were reintroduced to a  area within the park.

See also

Conservation of American bison
Yellow House Canyon
Palo Duro Canyon
Blanco Canyon
Mount Blanco

Mushaway Peak
Quitaque Creek
Caprock Escarpment
Prairie Dog Town Fork Red River

Canyon Valley, Texas
Double Mountain Fork Brazos River
North Fork Double Mountain Fork Brazos River
Little Red River (Texas)

References

External links
Caprock Canyons State Park and Trailway from Texas Parks and Wildlife (TPWD)
Caprock Canyons Facility Map (PDF) from TPWD
Caprock Canyons Trailway Map and Guide  (PDF) from TPWD

Video of the Texas State Bison Herd in Caprock Canyons State Park on the Texas Archive of the Moving Image

Protected areas of Briscoe County, Texas
State parks of Texas
Rail trails in Texas
Canyons and gorges of Texas
Protected areas established in 1982
1982 establishments in Texas
Bison herds
Grasslands of Texas